Santa Fe is a ward (consejo popular) in the municipality of Playa in Havana, Cuba.

Geography
It is bordered on the north by the Florida Strait, on the east by Jaimanitas, a former fishing village, on the west by Playa Baracoa, and on the south by Bauta in Artemisa Province.

Landmarks
 ELAM (Latin American School of Medicine) Cuba

References

External links
 Playa Santa Fe website

Wards of Havana